The  large-footed finch (Pezopetes capitalis) is a  passerine bird endemic to the highlands of Costa Rica and western Panama. Despite its name, it is not a true finch, but rather a member of the large family Passerellidae, which also includes American sparrows, juncos and towhees. It is the only member of the genus Pezopetes.

This is a common bird in the undergrowth of mountain forests, second growth, bamboo clumps, and scrubby pastures from  2150 m altitude to the scrubby páramo at 3350 m. It is readily seen in favoured sites such as Cerro de la Muerte.

The nest, built by the female, is a large loose cup of plant material placed less than 2 m up in bamboo or a dense shrub. The typical clutch is one or two brown-marked white or blue-white eggs, which are incubated by the female alone for 12–14 days before hatching.

It has a slender bill, a modestly sized tail and very large and powerful feet and legs. This species is one of the heaviest in its diverse family. The adult has a slate grey head, becoming black on the throat, forehead and crown sides. The upper parts are dark olive and the wings and tail are black with olive fringes. The underparts are bright olive with a brown tint to the flanks and lower belly. Young birds have a streaked dark olive head, blackish scaling to the upperparts, and buff-olive underparts .

The large-footed finch has a thin seet call, and the male's song, given from the ground or a low perch, consists of a mix or whistles, warbles, chatter and mimicry.

The large-footed finch feeds on insects, spiders, and seeds, extracted from the leaf litter with powerful double scratches that can send debris flying up to 30 cm. It will also pick berries from low bushes. It is normally seen in pairs.

References

 Stiles and Skutch,  A Guide to the Birds of Costa Rica, 

large-footed finch
Birds of the Talamancan montane forests
large-footed finch